England Hockey League may refer to:

Field hockey
 Men's England Hockey League
 Women's England Hockey League

Ice Hockey
 English League (ice hockey)
 English National Ice Hockey League
 English National League
 English National League (1981–82)
 English Premier Ice Hockey League